Bayg (also Romanized as Bāyg; also known as Bāyk) is a city and capital of Bayg District, in Torbat-e Heydarieh County, Razavi Khorasan Province, Iran. At the 2006 census, its population was 3,960, in 1,106 families.

References 

Populated places in Torbat-e Heydarieh County
Cities in Razavi Khorasan Province